Fort Totten Officers' Club, also known as the Castle, is a historic clubhouse located at Fort Totten in Bayside, Queens, New York. The officers' club was built in the 1870s and expanded to its present size in 1887.  It is a large Late Gothic Revival style building.  It is a two-story, rectangular frame building with a projecting central tower pavilion and sheathed in clapboard.  It features identical, polygonal, three story towers and a wood parapet surrounding the roofline.

It was listed on the National Register of Historic Places in 1986.

Bayside Historical Society
The Castle is now home to the Bayside Historical Society, which focuses on the area's history.  Exhibits include Bayside and Queens history and culture, as well as the building's history.

References

External links
Bayside Historical Society website

Clubhouses on the National Register of Historic Places in New York City
Gothic Revival architecture in New York City
Infrastructure completed in 1887
New York City Designated Landmarks in Queens, New York
Clubhouses in Queens, New York
National Register of Historic Places in Queens, New York
Military officers' clubs
Military facilities on the National Register of Historic Places in New York City